The Fire Services Act 1959 is an Act of the United Kingdom Parliament passed "to amend the Fire Services Act 1947, and make further provision as to the pensions of persons transferring to or from the fire service and as to members of fire brigades becoming temporary instructors in training establishments." . The Act has been repealed in England and Wales but not in Scotland.

Extent and Repeals
The Act applies to Great Britain only.

England and Wales
The Fire and Rescue Services Act 2004 repealed the whole Act in England and Wales only.

Scotland
The Fire (Scotland) Act 2005 repealed all except sections 8 to 10 of the Act; these sections deal with pensions and the employment of temporary instructors.

Northern Ireland
This Act does not extend to Northern Ireland.

See also

1959 in Scotland
United Kingdom Acts of Parliament 1959
Acts of the Parliament of the United Kingdom concerning Scotland
Fire and rescue in the United Kingdom